Parcé is a commune in the Ille-et-Vilaine department of Brittany in northwestern France.

Parce may also refer to:
 P.A.R.C.E., The fifth studio album by Colombian recording artist Juanes
 Parce (rum), A Colombian brand of rum